Luís Gabriel Silva Gomes (born 7 May 1994 in Vila Nova de Gaia) is a Portuguese cyclist, who currently rides for UCI Continental team .

Major results

2015
 1st Young rider classification Troféu Alpendre Internacional do Guadiana
 4th Overall Volta a Portugal do Futuro
1st Stage 4
2016
 1st Stage 2 Volta a Portugal do Futuro
2019
 Volta a Portugal
1st  Mountains classification
1st Stage 7
2020
 Volta a Portugal
1st  Points classification
1st Stage 1
 2nd Overall Troféu Joaquim Agostinho
 4th Road race, National Road Championships
2022
 2nd Clássica da Arrábida

References

External links

1994 births
Living people
Portuguese male cyclists
Sportspeople from Vila Nova de Gaia